Brackett is an unincorporated community located on U.S. Route 53 in the town of Washington, Eau Claire County, Wisconsin, United States. It was named for James M. Brackett, a newspaper editor and publisher. He was involved with the Eau Claire Free Press in the 1870s.

In popular culture
Indie/Alternative band Bon Iver has a song called "Brackett, WI", which was featured on the 2009 charity compilation album Dark Was The Night.

Notes

External links
 History of the Brackett School Area, 1949

Unincorporated communities in Eau Claire County, Wisconsin
Eau Claire–Chippewa Falls metropolitan area
Unincorporated communities in Wisconsin